Montagnareale (Sicilian: Muntagnariali) is a comune (municipality) in the Metropolitan City of Messina in the Italian region Sicily, located about  east of Palermo and about  west of Messina.  
 
Montagnareale borders the following municipalities: Gioiosa Marea, Librizzi, Patti, Sant'Angelo di Brolo.

References

External links
 Official website

Cities and towns in Sicily